Buhaina's Delight is a jazz album released by Art Blakey and the Jazz Messengers in 1963. Produced by Alfred Lion, the album was recorded in two sessions on November 28, 1961 and December 18, 1961 at Van Gelder Studio in Englewood Cliffs, New Jersey. The album was released by Blue Note Records in July 1963 after Blakey had moved to Riverside Records in late 1962.

Track listing
 "Backstage Sally" (Shorter) - 5:58
 "Contemplation" (Shorter) - 6:18
 "Bu's Delight" (Fuller) - 9:20
 "Reincarnation Blues" (Shorter) - 6:36
 "Shaky Jake" (Walton) - 6:38
 "Moon River" (Henry Mancini, Johnny Mercer) - 5:12

Personnel
 Art Blakey - drums
 Freddie Hubbard - trumpet
 Curtis Fuller - trombone
 Wayne Shorter - tenor saxophone
 Cedar Walton - piano
 Jymie Merritt - bass

References 

Art Blakey albums
The Jazz Messengers albums
Blue Note Records albums
1963 albums
Albums produced by Alfred Lion
Albums recorded at Van Gelder Studio